Henri de Laborde was a French fencer. He competed at the 1896 Summer Olympics in Athens and the 1900 Summer Olympics.

In 1896, de Laborde competed in the amateur foil event. He placed third of four in his preliminary group after winning one bout, against Ioannis Poulos, and losing the other two, to Henri Callot and Periklis Pierrakos-Mavromichalis. This put him in a tie for fifth overall, with Konstantinos Komninos-Miliotis who was third in the other preliminary group.

References

External links

Fencers at the 1896 Summer Olympics
19th-century sportsmen
Fencers at the 1900 Summer Olympics
French male foil fencers
Olympic fencers of France
Year of birth missing
Year of death missing
Place of birth missing
Place of death missing